Vicey is an unincorporated community in Buchanan County, Virginia, in the United States.

History
A post office called Visey operated in the 1890s. The community was named for a local woman, Vicey Clevinger.

References

Unincorporated communities in Buchanan County, Virginia
Unincorporated communities in Virginia